Mathew Thompson (born 25 February 1982) is an Australian rugby league and swimming commentator for the Nine Network. Thompson is the number 1 caller for the Nine Network. He was previously calling QLD cup games alongside Penrith Panthers grand final winner Scott Sattler and Brisbane based broadcaster Peter Psaltis. He regularly commentates NRL matches.

Career
Prior to Nine, Thompson was best known as a commentator and host for Fox Sports, a journalist and broadcaster with Sydney radio stations 2GB and 2UE and presenter and producer with Sky News Australia.

In 2022, Thompson succeeded Ray Warren as the Nine Network's chief rugby league caller. Thompson called his first NRL Grand Final in 2022 as well as his first State of Origin series.

He also regularly calls swimming events for the Nine Network.

Personal life
Thompson was born in Sydney and grew up in the Penrith district in New South Wales. He has two children, Samuel and Jacob.

References

Australian rugby league commentators
1982 births
Living people
Swimming commentators